Valor was a comic book published by EC Comics in 1955 as the second title in its New Direction line. The bi-monthly comic was published by Bill Gaines and edited by Al Feldstein. It lasted a total of five issues before being cancelled, along with EC's other New Direction comics.

Valor was dedicated to tales of action and adventure in various period settings, including Ancient Egypt, the Roman Empire, the Middle Ages, the Crusades, the French Revolution, and the Napoleonic era. It was similar in vein to the historical stories that previously appeared in EC's Two-Fisted Tales and Frontline Combat from 1950 through 1954.

Artists included Reed Crandall, George Evans, Gardner Fox, Graham Ingels, Bernard Krigstein, Joe Orlando, Angelo Torres, Al Williamson and Wally Wood.

Valor was reprinted as part of publisher Russ Cochran's Complete EC Library in 1988. Between October 1998 and February 1999, Cochran (in association with Gemstone Publishing) reprinted all five individual issues. This complete run was later rebound, with covers included, in a single softcover EC Annual.

Issue guide

EC Comics publications
Comics by Carl Wessler
Comics by Gardner Fox
1955 comics debuts
1955 comics endings